In statistics, the term linear model is used in different ways according to the context. The most common occurrence is in connection with regression models and the term is often taken as synonymous with linear regression model.  However, the term is also used in time series analysis with a different meaning. In each case, the designation "linear" is used to identify a subclass of models for which substantial reduction in the complexity of the related statistical theory is possible.

Linear regression models

For the regression case, the statistical model is as follows. Given a (random) sample  the relation between the observations  and the independent variables  is formulated as

where  may be nonlinear functions. In the above, the quantities  are random variables representing errors in the relationship. The "linear" part of the designation relates to the appearance of the regression coefficients,  in a linear way in the above relationship. Alternatively, one may say that the predicted values corresponding to the above model, namely

Given that estimation is undertaken on the basis of a least squares analysis, estimates of the unknown parameters  are determined by minimising a sum of squares function

From this, it can readily be seen that the "linear" aspect of the model means the following:
the derivatives of the function are linear functions of the  making it easy to find the minimising values;
the  minimising values  are linear functions of the observations ;

Time series models

An example of a linear time series model is an autoregressive moving average model. Here the model for values {} in a time series can be written in the form

In this instance the use of the term "linear model" refers to the structure of the above relationship in representing  as a linear function of past values of the same time series and of current and past values of the innovations. This particular aspect of the structure means that it is relatively simple to derive relations for the mean and covariance properties of the time series.

Other uses in statistics

There are some other instances where "nonlinear model" is used to contrast with a linearly structured model, although the term "linear model" is not usually applied. One example of this is nonlinear dimensionality reduction.

See also
 General linear model
 Generalized linear model
 Linear predictor function
 Linear system
 Linear regression
 Statistical model

References

Curve fitting
Regression models

ar:نموذج الانحدار الخطي
fr:Modèle linéaire